"Diamonds" is a song by English singer Sam Smith, released through Capitol Records on 18 September 2020 as the second single from their third studio album, Love Goes (2020). The song was written by Smith with its producers Shellback and Oscar Görres. A remix of the song by English DJ Joel Corry and an acoustic version were released on 9 October 2020.

Reception
"Diamonds" is a breakup song that sees Smith "snarl[ing] like Gloria Gaynor in divorce court". Samantha Hissong of Rolling Stone called the song "three minutes and 34 seconds of catharsis."

Track listing
Digital download - Acoustic
"Diamonds" (Acoustic) – 3:14

Digital download - Joel Corry Remix
"Diamonds" (Joel Corry Remix) – 3:15

Credits and personnel
Credits adapted from Smith's official website.

 Sam Smith vocals, songwriter 
 Shellback songwriter, producer, programming, drums, guitar, bass and epic triangle
 Oscar Görres songwriter, producer, programming, piano, keys and guitar
 Serban Ghenea mixing
 John Hanes engineer
 Duncan Fuller assistant engineer
 Randy Merrill mastering

Charts

Weekly charts

Year-end charts

Certifications

Release history

References

2020 singles
2020 songs
Sam Smith (singer) songs
Songs written by Oscar Görres
Songs written by Sam Smith (singer)
Songs written by Shellback (record producer)
Song recordings produced by Shellback (record producer)
Disco songs
Capitol Records singles